Andrew Winter may refer to:
Andrew Winter (Entrepreneur)
Andrew Winter (artist) (1892–1958), American artist
Andrew Winter (footballer), Scottish footballer
Andrew Winter (real estate), English-Australian property expert

See also
Andy Winter (disambiguation)